This is a list of episodes from the sixteenth season of Real Time with Bill Maher.

Episodes

Special (2018)

References

External links 
 HBO.com Episode List
 HBO.com Real Time with Bill Maher Free (audio-only) episodes and Overtime podcast
 TV.com Episode Guide
 

Real Time with Bill Maher seasons
2018 American television seasons